Hòa Lộc is a commune of Mỏ Cày Bắc District, Bến Tre Province, Vietnam. The commune covers 13.32 km2. In 1999 it had a population of 9,159 and a population density of 688 inhabitants/km2.

References

 

Communes of Bến Tre province
Populated places in Bến Tre province